DeVon Walker (born November 22, 1985) is a former indoor football defensive specialist who last played Kent Predators of the Indoor Football League. He played college football at Nevada.

High school career
Walker attended Gahr High School. While there, he lettered three times in football on offense and defense. Also during the season he was named defensive player-of-the-week three times and achieved the defensive mvp award.

Division I-A Recruiting

In 2005, Walker, a two-star cornerback recruit began receiving offers from Division I-A schools such as: Nevada, Idaho, San Diego State, TCU, Tulsa, and Washington State. He began favoring San Diego State, however he later chose to commit to Nevada.

University of Nevada-Reno (2006–2007)
After his sophomore season, was being recruited by multiple Division I-A schools. However, midway through the school year, Walker transferred to Nevada where he played for his final two college seasons. In 2006, in 10 games, he recorded 18 tackles, two passes broken up, and one forced fumble. Then as a senior, in 2007, in 13 games, with 13 starts, he recorded 85 tackles, 3 interceptions, and eighteen passes broken up. While at Nevada he was also a Communications major with a minors in Business and Music.

Professional career
Walker went unselected in the 2008 NFL Draft and was picked up by the Baltimore Ravens as a free agent, however failed to make it past training camp. Soon after Walker had several workouts with teams in the Canadian Football League, however failed to make a team as a starter. He then spent the last three weeks of the 2008 Arena Football League season with the San Jose SaberCats. He was then assigned to the Tri-Cities Fever on October 6, 2008.
Walker re-signed with the Tri-Cities Fever in 2010. He was the first player to be signed for the new Arena Football 1 fever team.

Personal life
Walker is the son of Lee Walker a well known Football Coach in Long Beach California and Jacqueline Harris a hard working nurse.
He is a Personal Trainer at Starfit Fitness Club, as well as the General Manager. He's now the owner of Limitless Sports Academy.
He has six children: Amoni Walker(15), Dillon Walker(13), Mia Walker(10), Axton Walker(7) Adiyah Walker(5) Aiden Walker(3)
He also is considered to be the BEST Madden player of all-time due to his victory against the 10th best player in the game.

References

1985 births
Living people
Baltimore Ravens players
Cerritos Falcons football players
Nevada Wolf Pack football players
San Jose SaberCats players
Players of American football from Compton, California
Tri-Cities Fever players
Everett Raptors players